Lynnfield may refer to

 Lynnfield, Massachusetts, a town in Essex County, Massachusetts
 Lynnfield (microprocessor), a CPU made by Intel
 Lynnfield (RTA Rapid Transit station), a light rail station in Shaker Heights, Ohio

See also
 Lynfield, New Zealand, a suburb of Auckland